List of Italian football transfers summer 2013 may refer to:
 List of Italian football transfers summer 2013 (co-ownership)
 List of Italian football transfers summer 2013 (July)
 List of Italian football transfers summer 2013 (August)

Football transfers summer 2013
2013